Jean-Marie Pérouse de Montclos (born 19 November 1936) is a French architectural historian.

Family
His family was an old bourgeois one originating in the Dauphiné. His earliest known ancestor is Jean Pérouse (died 1663), procurer, mayor of Vienne. Pierre Pérouse de Montclos (1746–1790), was mayor of and deputy for Roussillon, Didier Pérouse de Montclos (1786–1863) was a notary and Henri Pérouse de Montclos (1820–1892) was also mayor of Roussillon.

Life
Born in Amiens, he gained a diploma from the Institut d'études politiques de Paris. He also has a doctorate in literature. He is director of research at the CNRS. When André Malraux and André Chastel established France's Inventaire général du patrimoine culturel in 1964, de Montclos was the first researcher it recruited. He thus took responsibility for its research and documentation, coordinating their method and vocabulary and presiding over the national commission.

He teaches at the École de Chaillot and the École du Louvre and has written several works on early modern architecture. He is a member of France's Académie d'architecture and of the 'conseil scientifique' Centro Internazionale di Studi di Architettura Andrea Palladio (CISA, aka Palladio Museum). His son Marc-Antoine specialises in the politics of conflicts in sub-Saharan Africa and teaches at the Sciences Po Paris.

Works 

 1972 : Architecture. Méthode et vocabulaire, éd. du patrimoine, Paris, 7e éd. 2009 (1st edition, 1972), 622 p.  . Nouvelle édition 2011, revue et augmentée 
 1982 : L’Architecture à la française, du milieu du XVe à la fin du XVIIIe, éd. Picard, Paris, (republished 2013) 
 1984 : Les Prix de Rome, Berger-Levrault, École nationale supérieure des beaux-arts, Paris
 1989 : Histoire de l’architecture française, tome II. De la Renaissance à la Révolution, Mengès, Paris ; réimpr. 1995, 2003 
 1992 : Guide du patrimoine. Île-de-France, Hachette, Paris 
 1993 : Boullée, architecte visionnaire, Hermann 
 1994 : Étienne-Louis Boullée, Paris, Flammarion, 1994, 287 p. ( et 978-2-08-010075-7, OCLC 32078940, notice BnF no FRBNF35729762, LCCN 95130430)
 1996 : Guide du patrimoine. Languedoc-Roussillon, Hachette, Paris 
 1997 : Vaux-le-Vicomte, Paris, Scala (republished in 2008)
 1998 : Le Château de Fontainebleau, Paris, Scala ; réactualisé en 2009
 2001 : " Serlio à Fontainebleau " in Annali di architettura no. 13, Vicence 
 Philibert de l'Orme. Architecte du roi (1514–1570), Mengès, Paris.
 L’Art de France. De la Renaissance au Siècle des Lumières 1450–1770, Mengès, Paris
 2012 : L'École de Chaillot, une aventure des savoirs et des pratiques (architecture et patrimoine), with Florence Contenay and Benjamin Mouton, Paris, Éditions des Cendres / Cité de l'architecture et du patrimoine
 2012 : Ange-Jacques Gabriel, Éditions du Patrimoine, Paris

Honours 
 2005 : Prix Eugène Carrière pour L’Art de France. De la Renaissance au Siècle des Lumières 1450–1770
 14 November 1995 – Commander of the ordre des Arts et des Lettres.

References

20th-century French historians
French architectural historians
Living people
1936 births
People from Amiens
Commandeurs of the Ordre des Arts et des Lettres